Anteoninae are a subfamily of Dryinidae. There are 4 recent and 2 fossil genera, including Anteon.

References

External links 

Apocrita subfamilies
Dryinidae